Acanthodactylus lacrymae is a species of lizard in the family Lacertidae. The species is endemic to Morocco.

References

 

Acanthodactylus
Reptiles described in 2020
Taxa named by Aurélien Miralles
Taxa named by Philippe Geniez
Taxa named by Menad Beddek
Taxa named by Daniel Mendez-Aranda
Taxa named by José C. Brito
Taxa named by Raphael Leblois
Taxa named by Pierre-André Crochet